Proterospastis is a genus of moths belonging to the family Tineidae.

Species
Proterospastis abscisa (Gozmány, 1967)
Proterospastis antiphracta 	(Meyrick, 1909)
Proterospastis barystacta 	Meyrick, 1937
Proterospastis brandbergica 	Gozmány, 2004
Proterospastis craurota 	(Meyrick, 1920)
Proterospastis homestia 	(Meyrick, 1908)	
Proterospastis megaspila 	(Meyrick, 1913)
Proterospastis platyphallos 	Gozmány, 2004
Proterospastis taeniala 	(Gozmány, 1968)
Proterospastis trilinguis 	(Meyrick, 1920)
Proterospastis zebra 	(Walsingham, 1891)

References
De Prins, J. & De Prins, W. 2014. Afromoths, online database of Afrotropical moth species (Lepidoptera). World Wide Web electronic publication (www.afromoths.net) (15.Nov.2015)

Tineidae
Tineidae genera
Taxa named by Edward Meyrick